Fafe is a municipality in the northern Portuguese district of Braga. The population in 2021 was 48,502, in an area of approximately (. The city itself had a population of 14,144 in 2001. The present mayor is Antero Barbosa, elected by the Socialist Party. The municipal holiday is May 16.

History
In the 10th century King Ordoño III of León donated the Vila de Moraria (Moreira de Rei) and Monte Longo to the monastery of Guimarães, founded by the Countess Mumadona.

The territory was effect the Diocese of Braga in the 12th century, and was one of the largest of the seven dioceses, with approximately 950 to 1000 parishes divided into 38 group. During the 1220 Inquirições (Inquiries), the territory of Monte Longo was first identified. This location would have an effect; in 1258, the municipality was designated as the lands and julgado (judicial territory) of Monte Longo.

By 1320, Fafe was part of the Diocese of Braga and the Terra de Entre Ave e Vizela, also known as the Terra de Montelongo, with 15 parishes, among which Santa Ovaia Antiga (Santa Eulália de Fafe).

On 15 November 1514, King D. Manuel I conceded the first foral (charter) to the town of Fafe. The 1527 Numeramento de D. João III (census of King John III), the parish of Samta Ovaya Antigua (Santa Eulália) had only 64 neighbours.

It was only in 1647 that the first reference to the toponymy Fafe, and shortly thereafter (1655) the parish adopted the name Santa Eulália de Fafe.

In 1706, the donatário of the town of Fafe and municipality of Montelongo was the Count of Vimieiro. By mid-century, though, in 1758, the Memórias Paroquiais (Parochial Memories) described that the donation was attributed to the Marquis of Valença, D. Miguel de Portugal e Castro.

Between 1907 and 1986 Fafe was served by the narrow-gauge trains of the Guimarães line. The railway is now closed between Guimarães and Fafe.

Geography
The municipality is situated in a valley.

Administratively, the municipality is divided into 25 civil parishes:

 Aboim, Felgueiras, Gontim e Pedraído
 Agrela e Serafão
 Antime e Silvares (São Clemente) 
 Ardegão, Arnozela e Seidões
 Armil
 Cepães e Fareja
 Casa do Substimado
 Fafe
 Fornelos
 Freitas e Vila Cova
 Golães
 Medelo
 Monte e Queimadela
 Moreira do Rei e Várzea Cova
 Passos
 Quinchães
 Regadas
 Revelhe
 Ribeiros
 Santa Cristina de Arões
 São Gens
 São Martinho de Silvares
 São Romão de Arões
 Travassós
 Vinhós

Architecture

Civic
 Fafe Comarca Jailhouse
 Municipal Palace/Hall of Fafe

Religious
 Chapel of Prata
 Chapel of Nossa Senhora da Ajuda
 Chapel of Nossa Senhora da Conceição
 Chapel of Nossa Senhora do Desterro
 Chapel of Nossa Senhora das Graças
 Chapel of Nossa Senhora da Guadalupe
 Chapel of Nossa Senhora de Lourdes
 Chapel of Nossa Senhora do Socorro
 Chapel of Santa Bárbara
 Chapel of Santa Luzia
 Chapel of Santa Marinha
 Chapel of Santa Rita
 Chapel of Santo Amaro
 Chapel of Santo André

Notable people 
 Joaquim Gonçalves (1936–2013) a bishop of the Roman Catholic Diocese of Vila Real from 1991 to 2011.
 Armindo Freitas-Magalhães (born 1966) a psychologist working on the psychology of the human smile
 Sandro Cunha (born 1982) a former professional footballer with 385 club caps

References

Notes

Sources

External links
 Institute of Higher Studies of Fafe official Website
 Photos from Fafe

 
Towns in Portugal